Orgelbau Klais is a German firm that designs, builds and restores pipe organs. It is a family run company, founded in 1882 by Johannes Klais senior and is now run by his great-grandson Philipp Klais. The firm is based in Bonn, Germany, and has completed many large-scale building and restoration projects around the globe in more than a century of organ building.

History of the company 
Johannes Klais studied organ building in Alsace, Switzerland and Southern Germany. He founded his own organ building workshop in Bonn in 1882. His way of building organs was closely bound up with traditional construction methods using slider windchests. But as early as before the turn of the century he built high pressure stops with two mouths on pneumatic cone valve chests. In 1906, together with his son Hans, he introduced electric action. Hans Klais took over in 1925. In his time facade design began to come under the influence of the modern age, ergonomic console designs were also being developed.  Hans Gerd Klais, the founder's grandson, took charge in 1965. Philipp Klais, the great-grandson of the founder, studied organ building in Alsace, France; in Germany; and overseas. He now runs the company.

Klais instruments around the world 
Here is a short list naming a few of the Klais instruments around the world:
 Athens Concert Hall, in Athens, Greece with 6080 pipes
 Aachen Cathedral in Aachen, Germany.
 Beuron Archabbey church, Germany
 Basilica of Our Lady del Pilar in Saragossa, Spain, with 5.391 organ pipes inserted in a Renaissance (1529-1530) wooden frame, and inaugurated in 2008
 Cologne Cathedral in Cologne, Germany: The main instrument was finished in 1998 and although enormous, it is almost dwarfed inside the colossal gothic church as it clings to the balconies. Klais also restored other organs in the cathedral and added a detached console that operates all of them at once.
 St. Peter's church in Munich, Germany
 Trier Cathedral in Trier, Germany, 5602 pipes
 Münster Cathedral in Münster, Germany, approx. 7173 pipes
 Concert Hall of the Kraków Philharmonic, in Kraków, Poland
 Concert Hall of the Queensland Performing Arts Centre, in Brisbane, Australia, 6566 pipes
 Bath Abbey in Bath, Somerset, UK.
 Frauenkirche in Nuremberg, Germany
 St. John's, Smith Square in Westminster, UK, a redundant but still consecrated church which commissioned its organ when the building became a concert hall.
 Symphony Hall, Birmingham in Birmingham, UK. Finished in 2001, the 6000 pipes symphony organ is now the largest mechanical action organ in the UK.
 Leeds Cathedral, UK
 Hallgrímskirkja in Reykjavík, Iceland, 5275 pipes.
 Overture Hall in Madison, Wisconsin, U.S.
 Esplanade Concert Hall in Singapore, 4740 pipes, 61 registers
 Petronas Philharmonic Hall in Kuala Lumpur, Malaysia
 National Centre for the Performing Arts in Beijing, China. Finished in 2007, the 6500 pipes symphony organ with 94 stops is now the largest organ in China.
 St. Peter's Lutheran Church in New York City, U.S. 1978, 2 manuals, 43 ranks.
 The University of Iowa Voxman Music Building Concert Hall in Iowa City, IA, United States, completed in 2016, 3,883 pipes.
 Elbphilharmonie in Hamburg, Germany: 4 manuals, 65 registers, 4,765 pipes, completed December 2017
 Ohio Wesleyan University, in Delaware, Ohio, U.S.: 82 Ranks 55 Stops 4,644 pipes
 Church of Rodeio, Santa Catarina, Brazil.
 Centro Cultural Kirchner, Buenos Aires, Argentina.

References

Sources 
 Hans Gerd Klais: Beiträge zur Geschichte und Ästhetik der Orgel: Aus Anlass der Einhundertjahrfeier Orgelbau Johannes Klais Bonn, 1882–1982. Bonn 1983.
 Architecture of Music. Inspired pipe organs in world class buildings. Johannes Klais Orgelbau (Ed.), Bonn w.J.
 Horst Hodick: Johannes Klais (1852–1925); ein rheinischer Orgelbauer und sein Schaffen. Musikverlag Katzbichler, München/Salzburg 1993, .
 Ludger Stühlmeyer: Orgelbau in Hof. In: Musica sacra, 133. Jg. Journal 2, Kassel 2013, pp 104–105.

External links 

The official website of Orgelbau Klais

Companies established in 1882
Companies based in Bonn
Musical instrument manufacturing companies of Germany
Pipe organ building companies